David U. Himmelstein is an American academic physician specializing in internal medicine. He is a distinguished professor of public health and health policy in the CUNY School of Public Health at Hunter College, an adjunct clinical professor at Albert Einstein College of Medicine, and a lecturer at Harvard Medical School. He is also the co-founder (with Steffie Woolhandler) of Physicians for a National Health Program, an organization advocating for single-payer healthcare in the United States.

Biography
Himmelstein received his M.D. from the Columbia University College of Physicians and Surgeons. He then completed his training at the University of California San Francisco's Highland Hospital and his fellowship at Harvard Medical School, both in internal medicine. He was formerly the chief of the division of social and community medicine at Cambridge Hospital in Massachusetts.

Research
Himmelstein is the author or co-author of over 100 peer-reviewed articles on health care-related issues like medical bankruptcies and health care costs in the United States. For example, a 1984 study he published on patient dumping spurred the United States' Congress to pass the Emergency Medical Treatment and Active Labor Act, a law which banned the practice. With Woolhandler, he has also researched the effect of uninsurance on mortality.

References

External links
 Faculty page

Living people
American internists
Physicians from New York (state)
Hunter College faculty
Harvard Medical School faculty
Albert Einstein College of Medicine faculty
Columbia University Vagelos College of Physicians and Surgeons alumni
University of California, San Francisco alumni
Harvard Medical School alumni
American public health doctors
Year of birth missing (living people)